"Love's Sweet Exile" is a song by Welsh alternative rock band Manic Street Preachers. It was released on 28 October 1991 by record label Columbia as the second single from their debut album, Generation Terrorists (1992). The B-side, "Repeat (UK)", appears on the same album.

Content 

The track "Love's Sweet Exile" was originally called "Faceless Sense of Void". The principal difference between the two is that the original version does not have the chorus of the recorded version. The melody for the chorus was taken from another unreleased Manic Street Preachers song, "Just Can't Be Happy Without You". The band – James Dean Bradfield in particular – have said that they dislike the version recorded for Generation Terrorists.

Marc Burrows of Drowned in Sound proclaimed the song "easily the most metal Generation Terrorists gets", illustrating it to be a "trad-metal monster" embellished by "Bradfield's most over-the-top solo". Sam Shepard of MusicOHM alluded to the track's "glam metal stylings", while Martin Power drew comparisons to "the work of a prog metal band".

Release 

"Love's Sweet Exile" was released on 28 October 1991 by record label Columbia. The single reached number 26 in the UK Singles Chart on 9 November 1991, making it the band's highest charting single at that point.

The CD and standard 12-inch included "Democracy Coma" (which was an album track on the U.S. version of the debut album). There was also a limited gatefold 12-inch with a bonus live version of "Stay Beautiful".

Music video 

The video for the song directed by W.I.Z. is notable for its homoerotic imagery. Nicky Wire and Richey James Edwards are apparently naked while in close contact with each other, while Bradfield is also apparently naked, with an archery target drawn on his chest. The clip was also the first of many by the band to feature a favoured literary quote on screen. In this case, a piece of text credited to Albert Camus herald's the song; "And then came human beings. They wanted to cling, but there was nothing to cling to".

Track listings 
7-inch

CD and 12-inch

Limited edition gatefold 12-inch

Charts

References

Sources

External links 

 

1991 singles
Manic Street Preachers songs
Songs written by James Dean Bradfield
Columbia Records singles
1991 songs
Progressive metal songs
Songs written by Richey Edwards
Songs written by Nicky Wire
Songs written by Sean Moore (musician)